The 2015 IKEA stabbing attack occurred on 10 August when Abraham Ukbagabir fatally stabbed two people in an IKEA store in the Erikslund Shopping Center in Västerås, Sweden, as revenge for not being granted asylum in Sweden. The stabbing attracted worldwide attention. Ukbagabir was convicted of two first degree murder charges and sentenced to life in prison in December 2015.

Attack
The perpetrator, Abraham Ukbagabir, a 36-year-old  Eritrean Christian, took a knife from the kitchenware department at IKEA in Västerås and began looking for Swedish-looking people to attack. He attacked two victims; Carola Herlin (55) and her son Emil Herlin (28). The victims were on a visit from their hometown outside of Skellefteå in northern Sweden. The attack was not caught on any surveillance cameras, but according to eyewitness accounts made to the Aftonbladet newspaper, the attacker stabbed the mother in her stomach. Her son died from wounds inflicted by the perpetrator when he tried to fend off the attack. The perpetrator then proceeded to stab himself in the stomach.

Swedish police were silent about the case, which is standard procedure during criminal investigations in Sweden to prevent potential contamination of evidence, such as witness testimony. Information usually only becomes public after indictment, when the preliminary investigation is finished. A spokesperson for the police did however say that incident did not appear to have been an act of terrorism, and it did not have an obvious political or religious motive.

Perpetrator
Abraham Ukbagabir (born 25 February 1979) confessed to the attack, three days later, in a court hearing via telephone from his hospital bed. According to sources at the temporary accommodation he was staying at, Ukbagabir had lived in Italy two to three months prior to his arrival in Sweden, where he had worked as a fisherman. He had been denied asylum in Sweden just hours before the attack, and was scheduled for deportation back to Italy, where he had acquired a residence permit. His 23-year-old companion, also Eritrean, was initially arrested as an accessory to murder, but later released. On August 31, 2015, the companion was cleared of all charges.

Ukbagabir remained for a period in hospital, watched by security guards, prison officers and under police surveillance. The district court ordered that he should undergo a full psychiatric assessment. The police expected to interview up to 600 people.

In October 2015, Ukbagabir was found guilty of two first degree murders and was sentenced to life, as well as permanent extradition. Svea Court of Appeal confirmed the sentence in December 2015. Ukbagabir told in court that he felt treated unfairly when his appeal for asylum was rejected and he decided to kill someone as revenge.

While in prison, Ukbagabir was attacked and injured by fellow prisoners on multiple occasions requiring hospital care.

Reactions
Following the attack, the Västerås IKEA temporarily closed and then suspended the sale of knives out of concern for the staff. Rumours about the attack ran rampant on social media. A particularly widespread rumour was that the perpetrator was Somali and had been heard shouting "Allahu Akbar" after decapitating the victims. The police refused to address any rumours, citing confidentiality during the preliminary investigation. This led to a debate about Swedish journalism ethics and lack of references in news based on race and religion versus the alternative media and their lack of ethics.

On August 13, three days after the attack, the police were forced to break up an illegal demonstration outside the asylum centre where the two men linked to the murders had lived. A group of about ten men carrying symbols of an extreme-right wing youth organization held anti-immigration placards, shouted anti-Arab slogans and threw eggs at the building. Two days later, the asylum centre closed down after police found two bags of flammable liquid nearby.

Aftermath

The murders came at a time when public debate on questions of immigration and immigrant integration were becoming increasingly heated in Sweden, Scandinavia, and all of Europe. In the immediate aftermath of the murders, online rumors flew about possible Islamic motivations of the perpetrators, but Eva Morén, assistant prosecutor for the Västmanland District Court, told The Washington Post that both Ukbagabir and Mahari are Christian.

Sweden Democrats MP Björn Söder referenced the Ikea murders in a Facebook post and called on Swedes to consign their long-standing "sjuklöverns" ("seven-clover", disparaging term for the mainstream parties) approach to immigration to the "trash heap."  Some MPs from other parties accused him of using the Ikea stabbings to push an anti-migrant agenda and raised questions about his fitness to serve as second deputy speaker of the Riksdag.

See also

2015 Gothenburg pub shooting
Trollhättan school attack
Killing of Alexandra Mezher

References

Attacks in Europe in 2015
Deaths by stabbing in Sweden
Stabbing attacks in 2015
Ikea
IKEA
August 2015 events in Europe
August 2015 crimes in Europe
Knife attacks
Stabbing attacks in Sweden
2015 murders in Sweden
Racially motivated violence against white Europeans